Nainital Cantonment is a cantonment town in Nainital district in the Indian state of Uttarakhand, close to the hill station of Nainital. Established in the year 1878, today the Nainital Cantonment is a Class IV cantonment.
Current CEO of cantonment board is Shri Varun Kumar.

Geography

Demographics
 India census, Nainital Cantonment had a population of 1281. Males constitute 52% of the population and females 48%. Nainital Cantonment has an average literacy rate of 82%, higher than the national average of 59.5%: male literacy is 86%, and female literacy is 78%. In Nainital Cantonment, 8% of the population is under 6 years of age.

References

External links
 Nainital Cantonment Board, website

Cities and towns in Nainital district
Nainital
Cantonments of British India
Cantonments of India
Populated places established in 1878